The North Entrance Road Historic District comprises Yellowstone National Park's North Entrance Road from Gardiner, Montana to the park headquarters at Mammoth Hot Springs, Wyoming, a distance of a little over five miles (8 km). The North Entrance Road was the first major road in the park, necessary to join the U.S. Army station at Fort Yellowstone to the Northern Pacific Railroad station at Gardiner. The road includes the Roosevelt Arch at the northern boundary of the park and winds through rolling terrain before crossing the Gardner River and joining the Grand Loop Road. 

The North Entrance Road is an unsigned portion of US 89.

History 

The road was planned in 1883 by Lieutenant Dan Kingman of the U.S. Army Corps of Engineers and later on improved by Captain Hiram M. Chittenden of the Corps.,.  It replaced the old Gardiner High Road which went from behind the Mammoth Hotel north over the ridges west of the river to the town of Gardiner.  The first permanent entrance station to house rangers checking vehicle entering the park was constructed in 1921.  It replaced temporary tents used by rangers at the Roosevelt Arch.

The road was destroyed in the 2022 Montana floods. Most of the road was washed away by the river. On October, 30, 2022, Old Gardiner Road was opened to regular visitor traffic between Gardiner and Mammoth Hot Springs, to bypass the damaged North Entrance Road.

Gallery

See also
 Fort Yellowstone
 Grand Loop Road Historic District
 Lake Fish Hatchery Historic District
 Mammoth Hot Springs Historic District
 Roosevelt Lodge Historic District
 Old Faithful Historic District

Further reading

Notes

External links

National Park Service Video - Old Gardiner Road
North Entrance Road Historic District at the Wyoming State Historic Preservation Office

National Register of Historic Places in Yellowstone National Park
Roads on the National Register of Historic Places in Montana
Roads on the National Register of Historic Places in Wyoming
Transportation in Park County, Montana
Transportation in Park County, Wyoming
Historic American Engineering Record in Wyoming
Historic American Engineering Record in Montana
Historic districts on the National Register of Historic Places in Montana
Historic districts on the National Register of Historic Places in Wyoming
National Register of Historic Places in Park County, Montana
National Register of Historic Places in Park County, Wyoming
Gates in the United States
1883 establishments in the United States
Buildings and structures in Yellowstone National Park in Montana